Excess may refer to:

 Angle excess, in spherical trigonometry
 Insurance excess, similar to a deductible
 Excess, in chemistry, a reagent that is not the limiting reagent
 "Excess", a song by Tricky from the album Blowback
 Excess (album), an album by Coma

See also

 Excess-K, or offset binary, in computing
 XS (disambiguation)